Transient neonatal diabetes mellitus (TNDM) is a form of neonatal diabetes presenting at birth that is not permanent. This disease is considered to be a type of maturity onset diabetes of the young (MODY).

Types

Cause
This condition has to do with genetics and is often associated with having an added Chromosome 7 gene (mostly from the paternal side).

The form on chromosome 6 can involve imprinting.

Diagnosis

Management

See also
 Permanent neonatal diabetes mellitus

References

Further reading
GeneReview/NIH/UW entry on 6q24-Related Transient Neonatal Diabetes Mellitus

External links 

Diabetes
Neonatology